Conquistando Corazones is the fourth studio album from Duranguense band K-Paz de la Sierra.

Track listing
 "Procuro olvidarte"
 "No te apartes de mí"
 "La puerta de Alcalá" 
 "Amor mío"
 "Charola de plata"
 "Y Aquí Estoy" (featuring Ana Gabriel)
 "Tu me atrapaste"
 "San Juan del Río" 
 "Hey!" 
 "Te juro que te amo" 
 "La vida es "Amor inmenso" (featuring Cruz Martínez Y Los Kumbia Kings)

Charts

Singles

Sales and certifications

References

Notes
K-Paz de la Sierra Official MySpace

K-Paz de la Sierra albums
2006 albums
Disa Records albums